Benito Juárez Marg is a major road in South Delhi near Dhaula Kuan. Named after the Mexican politician Benito Juárez, it is approximately 2 Kilometers long and connects the Rao Tula Ram Marg with the Ring Road. The road is notable as the South Campus of Delhi University is located along the road. The other side has a number of diplomatic missions and residential areas.

Landmarks and nearby areas

Educational institutions
South Campus, Delhi University
Sri Venkateswara College
Aryabhatta College
Ram Lal Anand College
Motilal Nehru College
 ARSD College 
Springdales School, Dhaula Kuan branch
Indian Mountaineering Foundation

Localities
Anand Niketan - It has a number of diplomatic missions including those of Mexico and Armenia.
Satya Niketan - A largely residential colony and student hub, it contains many shops and eateries catering to the student population of South Campus. It is a popular location for seeking off campus accommodation.

References

Streets in Delhi